Sativum, a Latin word meaning cultivated, may refer to:

 Allium sativum, the garlic
 Coriandrum sativum, coriander
 Hordeum sativum, barley
 Lepidium sativum, garden cress
 Origanum sativum, Brazilian oregano
 Pisum sativum, the pea
 Ribes sativum, the whitecurrant

See also
 List of Latin and Greek words commonly used in systematic names
 Sativa
 Sativus (disambiguation)